The Canal das Rolas ("Rolas Channel") is a strait of the Atlantic Ocean separating the small Ilhéu das Rolas (also: Ilhéu Gago Coutinho) from the southernmost point of the island of São Tomé, in São Tomé and Príncipe. There is a ferry departing from Ponta Baleia on São Tomé Island to Ilhéu das Rolas.

References

Bodies of water of São Tomé and Príncipe
Straits of the Atlantic Ocean